Hemidactylus maculatus, also known as the spotted  leaf-toed gecko or giant spotted gecko, is a species of large gecko found in the Western Ghats of India and in parts of Sri Lanka.

Description
Head large, oviform; snout longer than the distance between the eye and the ear-opening, 1.25 the diameter of the orbit; forehead concave; canthus rostralis swollen; ear-opening large, oval. Body and limbs moderate. Digits moderately dilated, free, inner well developed: infradigital lamellae almost perfectly straight, 9 to 11 under the inner digit, 12 or 13 under the median. Head covered anteriorly with convex granular scales, smaller in the frontal concavity, posteriorly with minute granules intermixed with round tubercles; rostral subtetragonal, not twice as broad as deep, with median cleft above; nostril pierced between the rostral, the first labial, and three or four nasals; 10 to 12 upper and 9 or 10 lower labials, mental large, triangular or pentagonal, twice as long as the adjacent labials; two pairs of chin-shields, the inner the larger, elongate, in contact behind the mental. Upper surfaces with minute, granular scales intermixed with moderate-sized trihedral, more or less strongly keeled tubercles, the largest not measuring more than one third the diameter of the eye; they are arranged very irregularly on the back, in about 20 longitudinal series. Abdominal scales smooth, roundish, imbricate. Male with a long series of femoral pores, 19 to 25 on each side, interrupted on the preanal region. Tail rounded, tapering, depressed; above with small irregular keeled scales, and 6 or 8 longitudinal series of large trihedral tubercles; beneath with a median series of transversely enlarged plates. Brown above, with darker spots, generally confluent into transverse undulating bands on the back; two more or less distinct dark streaks on each side of the head, passing through the eye; lower surfaces dirty white.
From snout to vent 4.5 inches; tail 5.

Distribution
Southern India and Sri Lanka.
Race hunae: India (Malabar, Tirunelveli, Salem, near Madras), Sri Lanka.
Type locality: restricted to Bombay by Smith 1935.

Notes

References
 Boulenger, G.A. 1885 Catalogue of the Lizards in the British Museum (Nat. Hist.) I. Geckonidae, Eublepharidae, Uroplatidae, Pygopodidae, Agamidae. London: 450 pp.
 Deraniyagala, P. E. P. 1937 A new gecko Hemidactylus maculatus hunae. Ceylon Journal of Science, 20:185-189.
 Duméril, A.M. C. and G. Bibron. 1836 Erpetologie Générale ou Histoire Naturelle Complete des Reptiles. Vol.3. Libr. Encyclopédique Roret, Paris, 528 pp.
 Nalavade, Sanjeev B. 1997 An oversize rock gecko (Hemidactylus maculatus) from Igatpuri, Maharashtra Cobra 30: 19-20

External links
 
 http://www.uroplatus.com/photopage/images/Hemidactylus%20maculatus%2002.jpg
 http://www.uroplatus.com/photopage/images/Hemidactylus%20maculatus%2003.jpg

Hemidactylus
Reptiles described in 1836
Taxa named by André Marie Constant Duméril
Taxa named by Gabriel Bibron